Great white heron may refer to:

 The all-white population of the great blue heron
 Great egret

Animal common name disambiguation pages